The Miryang gang rape, known in South Korea as the Miryang middle school girls rape incident, was a criminal incident that occurred in Miryang, South Korea in 2004. At least 44 to up to 120+ male high school students gang raped several middle school and high school girls over the course of 11 months. The case provoked controversy due to police mistreatment of the victims and lenient handling of the offenders.

Assaults
The victims lived in Ulsan and Changwon, while the perpetrators were from Miryang and Changwon. The perpetrators were initially believed to be members of a high school gang, but little evidence for this was found. They met the first 14-year-old victim over the phone. When she visited them, she was sexually assaulted, with the scene being filmed for blackmail. According to police, she was raped up to 10 times by 3 to 24 high school boys in each occurrence, they apparently did it for no reason, just enjoyment and/or revenge from a breakup.  with at least 44 boys being involved over 11 months. The girl was ordered to bring her 13-year-old sister and 16-year-old cousin to Miryang, where the cousin was assaulted. The original police report stated that the younger sister was sexually assaulted as well, but it may only have been a physical assault.  The boys were also accused of raping two other girls. They allegedly extorted money from their victims.

Press coverage

Netizens' anger
When the case was first reported on December 7, 2004, netizens started making posts criticizing the realities of education and stating that the perpetrators should be severely punished.

Reports came out on December 8 that among the 44 perpetrators, an arrest warrant was applied for only three, to which netizens responded "arrest all of the perpetrators," and they began to turn loose on the police.

Aftermath
After the sisters' aunt reported the rapes to the police, three of the boys were arrested. Following protests from the victims and public, another nine students were arrested, and 29 booked without detention. Family members of the perpetrators threatened the victims, warning them that they should "watch out from now on for reporting our sons to police." In a television interview, a parent of one of the offenders stated, "Why should we feel sorry for the victim's family? Why don't you consider our suffering? Who can resist temptation when girls are trying to seduce boys? They should have taught their daughters how to behave in order to avoid this kind of accident." One girl reportedly quit school after repeated visits and verbal attacks from the offenders' parents.

A controversy erupted over allegations that the police had mistreated the victims, culminating in a candlelight vigil by 150 protesters. The victims had asked to be questioned by a female police officer, but their request was ignored. One police officer allegedly said to the victims, "Did you try to entice the guys? You ruined the reputation of Miryang. The boys who would be leading the city in the future are now all arrested thanks to you. What are you going to do? [...] I am afraid that my daughter will turn out like you." Police also leaked enough information to the media for the victims to be identified. Furthermore, they forced the victims to identify the suspects face-to-face, rather than through a one-way mirror, with the officer asking the victim, "Did he insert [it] or not?" One of the victims had to be hospitalized for psychiatric treatment after these experiences. In August 2007, the Seoul High Court found the Miryang police officers guilty of negligence in protecting the victims, and ordered them to pay damages totaling 50 million won to two of the victims and their family. The decision was upheld by the Supreme Court of South Korea in June 2008, which set the compensation at 70 million won.

Prosecutors sent most of the accused to Juvenile Court or dropped charges. Ten others were formally accused of group sexual assault, with prosecutors asking for two to four years imprisonment with a three-year stay of execution. Citing the young age of the offenders and the fact that some had already been admitted to college or hired for jobs, the judges refused the charges against even these ten, instead sending them to Juvenile Court. One factor in this decision was that the father of one of the victims formed an agreement with some of the offenders to plead for leniency after receiving a large sum of money. The father was an alcoholic who had divorced the victim's mother three years prior due to his domestic violence, but retained parental rights over his daughter, and persuaded her to accept the agreement. Ultimately, only five suspects were sent to a juvenile detention center, and none were convicted of criminal charges. In 2012, it emerged that the female friend of one of the perpetrators had become a police officer.

See also 
 Han Gong-ju, a film inspired by these events
 Signal, the Inju Gang Rape case in this series was partially based on this event

References

External links
 
 Justice for Miryang Victims
 Serial gang rapes in Miryang
 Too Cruel for School
 Friend of Rapist Becomes Police Officer, Netizens Disgusted
 <와글와글 net세상>밀양 집단성폭행 옹호녀 논란
집단성폭행 가해자 41명외 ‘70여명’ 더 있다 한겨레신문  2004.12.09
성폭행 보다 잔인한 학교·사회 '충격'…'밀양사건' 피해 여학생 결국 가출 조선일보 2007.06.17
경관이 성폭행피해자 ‘폭언’ 한겨레 2004년 12월 11일자

Gang rape in Asia
2004 crimes in South Korea
2005 in South Korea
Miryang
History of South Korea
Sexual abuse cover-ups
Rape in South Korea
Child sexual abuse in South Korea
Sex gangs
Incidents of violence against girls